The Townsend Site is a major prehistoric Native American site in Sussex County, Delaware.  The Late Woodland site includes at least 90 significant features, including numerous burial sites.  The site received its first thorough study in 1948, and was the first Late Woodland site in the state to be examined in consultation with professional archaeologists of the Smithsonian Institution, and resulted in the creation of a typology of ceramics found.

The site was listed on the National Register of Historic Places in 1978.

See also
National Register of Historic Places listings in Sussex County, Delaware

References

Archaeological sites on the National Register of Historic Places in Delaware
Sussex County, Delaware
National Register of Historic Places in Sussex County, Delaware